Atriplex plebeja is a species of plant in the family Amaranthaceae. It is endemic to Tristan da Cunha, including Inaccessible and Nightingale Islands.  Its natural habitat is rocky shores. It is threatened by habitat loss.

References

Flora of Tristan da Cunha
plebeja
Critically endangered plants
Taxonomy articles created by Polbot